Abderrahmane Boultif (born 28 February 1987) is an Algerian footballer who plays as a goalkeeper for CA Batna in the Algerian Ligue 2.

References

External links

1987 births
Living people
Association football goalkeepers
Algerian footballers
JS Kabylie players
People from Batna, Algeria
Algerian Ligue Professionnelle 1 players
Algerian Ligue 2 players
CA Bordj Bou Arréridj players
CA Batna players
CRB Aïn Fakroun players
21st-century Algerian people